Heath Chapman (born 31 January 2002) is an Australian rules football player who plays for the Fremantle Dockers in the Australian Football League (AFL).

Early career

Chapman played junior football for the Joondalup Kinross Junior Football Club and attended Prendiville  Catholic College. He played for West Perth in the West Australian Football League. Known for his intercept marking skills and speed, Chapman ran the fastest 2 km time trial at the 2020 WA draft combine testing.

AFL career

Chapman made his AFL debut in the second round of the 2021 AFL season in Fremantle's win over Greater Western Sydney. Round one of the 2022 AFL season versus  saw Chapman receive much praise for his 'game-winning Intercept play' in which he spoiled an opponents kick on the goal line conceding no score with just seven seconds left in the match. With just a point the difference had the ball been rushed through for a behind the game would have been a draw. Chapman received a 2022 AFL Rising Star nomination for his performance in round 8 against North Melbourne at Optus Stadium.

Statistics
 Statistics are correct to the end of round 10, 2022

|- style="background-color: #EAEAEA"
! scope="row" style="text-align:center" | 2021
|
| 27 || 6 || 1 || 0 || 50 || 35 || 85 || 27 || 10 || 0.2 || 0.0 || 8.3 || 5.8 || 14.2 || 4.5 || 1.7
|-
! scope="row" style="text-align:center" | 2022
|
| 27 || 8 || 0 || 0 || 85 || 65 || 150 || 42 || 14 || 0.0 || 0.0 || 10.6 || 8.1 || 18.8 || 5.3 || 1.8
|- class="sortbottom"
! colspan=3| Career
! 14
! 1
! 0
! 135
! 100
! 235
! 69
! 24
! 0.1
! 0.0
! 9.6
! 7.1
! 16.8
! 4.9
! 1.7
|}

Notes

References

External links

 
WAFL player profile

2002 births
Living people
Fremantle Football Club players
West Perth Football Club players
Australian rules footballers from Western Australia
Peel Thunder Football Club players